Sandipan Chattopadhyay (25 October 1933 – 12 December 2005) was an Indian Bengali writer. His 1961 book "Kritadas Kritadasi" changed the landscape of Bengali fiction and made his name. A staunch anti-establishment figure and a supporter of creative freedom, Sandipan for some time refused association with the big Bengali publishing houses.

He was one of the pioneers of the Hungryalism Movement হাংরি আন্দোলন, also known as the Hungry generation, during 1961–65, though he, along with Binoy Majumdar, Shakti Chattopadhyay quit the movement over literary differences with fellow members Malay Roy Choudhury, Subimal Basak, Tridib Mitra and Samir Roychoudhury.

He was awarded the Sahitya Academy award for his book Ami O Banabihari.In His Sahityo Academy Award-winning novel Ami O Banabihari (2000), Sandipan fashions a very subtle critique of the ruling Communist party on the basis of an exclusion and silencing of the real ‘sub-altern’—the tribal proletariat. His decision to dedicate the novel to Budhyadeb Bhattacharya (called ‘poet, dramatist and minister’ in the dedicatory note) is a funny little polemic! He died after a prolonged respiratory illness in December 2005.

Some of his best known writings include Cholerar Dingulite Prem, "Shaper Chokher Bhitor Diye" (short story), Kukur Samparke Duto Ekta Katha Ja Ami Jani, "Seishab Dinratri" (short story), Hiroshima, My Love, Astitva Atithi Tumi, Esho Nipabane, Kritodas kritodasi, Biplob o Rajmohan, Rubi kakhon asbe, Jongoler Dinratri, Ami Arob Guerrilla der sSomorthon Kori, Double bed a eka, and Swarger nirjon upokule.

Literary career
Sandipan's first publication was a book of short stories, ‘Kritadash Kritadashi’ (1961); his second collection of short stories ‘Shamabeto Protiddwandi o Anyanyo’ was published after a hiatus of nine years. In the late 1960s he initiated a series of self-published works, including ‘Biplab O Rajmohon (1969)’, ‘Shomen Paliter Boibahik (1970)’ and ‘25she Boishakher Shurjo (1970)’. Called ‘the prince of little magazines’ by friend and fellow poet Shakti Chattopadhyay, Sandipan's novel ‘Ekhon Amar Kono Ashukh Nei’ was published in the annual Anandabazar Patrika in 1977, after which his novels and short stories were published by big houses such as Protikhhon and Ajkal.
 
Soon after the publication of his early masterpiece ‘Bijoner Raktomangsho’, when everyone started to compare him with Albert Camus, Sandipan declared, he had not read Camus. However, he called himself ‘Camus-kator’(i.e. in awe of Camus) after reading him later. His other favourite European writers were Franz Kafka and Jean Genet. Poet Shankha Ghosh called him the ‘only contemporary European-minded Bengali author’. Fellow writer Shyamal Gangopadhyay jokingly said that Sandipan always wrote great French in Bengali and also considered his novel Hiroshima, My Love (1989) to be the first truly international novel written in the language.
  An avid admirer of Kamalkumar Majumdar and his inheritance of a Bankimi brand of Bengali modernity as different from the Tagorian model on the one hand and someone steeped into the European avant garde on the other, Sandipan's aesthetics has within it, an ambivalent dialogue between the indigenous and the Western. While he held himself as a true Indian writer on the ground of writing in the vernacular, he also expressed his wish of undergoing his own funeral journey not with a Gita, but a copy of James Joyce's Ulysses on his chest.

Sandipan's reception in the 60s was marked with the European existentialist ambit of Kafka, Camus, Sartre and so on. Sandipan's works indeed have echoes from these authors and narrative situations that can be seen as a representation of the absurdist human condition. Rubi in
Rubi Kakhan ashbe
(1993) is reminiscent of Samuel Beckett's Godot as a principle of absence and Rajmohon in
Biplab O Rajmohon
is definitely influenced by Camus's notions of suicide.

Sandipan joined Ajkal as an employee in the 1980s and his novels became a regular feature in the Pujo-shankhyas of Ajkal from then on until his death. As the Ajkal edition of his complete novels testifies, he received two of the most coveted awards of the literary establishment — Bankim Purashkar in 1995 and Shahityo Academy Purashkar in 2002.  As representative of an aggressively experimental postmodernist avant-garde, Sandipan Chattopadhyay alternated between the mainstream and the parallelstream, the establishment and the anti-establishment, blurring their distinctions in the process.

Career in newspaper
Sandipan Chattopadhyay worked as an editorial assistant with Aajkaal Daily from its inception in 1981. There, he pioneered the publishing of images and letters to the editor. He continued his association with Aajkaal until his death. He published several works of fiction for this paper's Sarod (Annual) edition, which later became best-selling novels.

List of works

Novels

Short story collections

 Kritadas Kritadasi (ক্রীতদাস-ক্রীতদাসী) (1961)
 Samabeto Pratidwandhi O Ananya (সমবেত প্রতিদ্বন্দ্ধী ও অন্যান্য) (1969)
 Han Priyotama (হ্যাঁ প্রিয়তমা)
 Ek Je Chilo Dewal (এক যে ছিল দেয়াল)
 Sonali Danar Eagle (সোনালী ডানার ঈগল)

Awards and honours

 1995: Bankim Puraskar
 2002: Sahitya Akademi Award for the book Aami O Banabihari

Personal life
Sandipan was the seventh child of Upendranath Chattopadhyay and Narayani Chattopadhyay. In 1965 he married Rina Chattopadhyay. Trina Chattopadhyay, their only child, was born in 1966.

See also

 Sunil Gangopadhyay
 Shakti Chattopadhyay
 Samir Roychoudhury
 Subimal Basak
 Basudeb Dasgupta
 Malay Roy Choudhury
 Tridib Mitra
 Hungry generation
 Binoy Majumdar

References

 Writers from Kolkata

External links
Litterateur Sandipan Chattopadhyay dead Times of India – 12 December 2005
The Unfininished Autobiography of Sandipan Chattopadhyay on Boipara-r Blogpara
Patricide and Historical Neurosis in Sandipan Chattopadhyays Novel Swarger Nirjan Upokule

1933 births
2005 deaths
Bengali writers
Bengali-language writers
Recipients of the Sahitya Akademi Award in Bengali
University of Calcutta alumni
Hungry generation
Poets from West Bengal